Cees Koeken (born 29 October 1948) is a Dutch former cyclist.

Major results
1967
 3rd Ronde van Midden-Zeeland
1971
 1st Stage 1 Olympia's Tour
 1st Stage 4 Tour of Britain
1972
 1st Stage 8 Vuelta a España
 1st Stage 9 Tour de l'Avenir
 5th Paris–Tours

References

1948 births
Living people
Dutch male cyclists
Cyclists from Zundert
20th-century Dutch people